The Newfoundland Reform Liberal Party was a leader-centred political party in Newfoundland and Labrador, Canada from 1975 to 1979. It backed the return to power of Joey Smallwood after the former premier failed to regain the leadership of the Liberal Party of Newfoundland and Labrador in 1974.

1975 election
The Newfoundland Reform Liberal Party ran 28 candidates in the 1975 provincial election. With the Newfoundland and Labrador House of Assembly having been expanded to 51 seats for the election Smallwood did not expect to win an outright mandate, rather, he hoped his presence would result in a hung parliament (with no party holding a majority of seats) in which the former premier could use the resulting bargaining power to return to office.

Although Smallwood succeeded in winning four seats for his new party in the House of Assembly (including his own), his overall plan backfired as the resulting vote splitting with the established Liberal Party ultimately contributed to success Progressive Conservatives under Frank Moores, who won a second consecutive majority government despite losing a considerable share of their popular vote.

Elected Members

 Eric Dawe
 Wilson Callan - left party in 1976 for Liberals and then for the PC from 1981 onwards
 Rod Moores - return to the Liberals after 1979 and sat as MHA until 1982
 Joey Smallwood - resigned as leader 1979

Dissolution
Publicly, Smallwood claimed the result to be a success - in his view, he had succeeded in preventing the established Liberal Party from returning to power. Smallwood spent the next two years unsuccessfully trying to negotiate a merger of the breakaway party with his old party, always with the stipulation that he would be leader of the merged party. Finally, in 1977, Smallwood resigned his seat in the House of Assembly and left politics for good.

The Newfoundland Reform Liberal Party never elected a new leader to replace Smallwood and disappeared as an effective political force following its founding leader's departure, although it continued to exist on paper until the 1979 Newfoundland general election was called. The party was subsequently dissolved by the provincial chief electoral officer after it failed to nominate any candidates for the election.

Leader
 Joey Smallwood 1975-1977

References

Reform Liberal Party
Defunct political parties in Canada
Liberal parties in Canada